CSS Savannah is the name of two ships in the Confederate States Navy:

 , a sidewheel steamer converted to a gunboat in 1861
 , an ironclad ram launched in 1863

Ships of the Confederate States Navy